Urbain de Florit de La Tour de Clamouze, SS.CC., (born Alphonse de Florit de La Tour de Clamouze; 7 October 1794 – 2 August 1868) was a French nobleman and later lay brother of the Congregation of the Sacred Hearts of Jesus and Mary, a religious institute of the Roman Catholic Church. He was part of the Roman Catholic mission in the Gambier Islands from 1835 until his death in 1863. He founded and headed the Re'e Seminary College on Aukena, one of the earliest institution of higher learning in the South Pacific, where native Mangarevan boys were taught Latin and French as future clergymen. The young King Joseph Gregorio II was also educated at the College.

References

Bibliography

1794 births
1868 deaths
French Roman Catholic missionaries
French Polynesian Roman Catholics
Roman Catholic missionaries in French Polynesia
People from the Gambier Islands
Picpus Fathers
People from Lozère
French nobility